Marijampolė railway station is one of the most ornate buildings of such type in Lithuania. It was designed by Edmundas Frykas in Art Deco architectural style.

Gallery

References

Buildings and structures in Marijampolė
Railway stations in Lithuania
Buildings and structures completed in 1924